Neoacanthina is a genus of flies in the family Stratiomyidae.

Distribution
Brazil.

Species
Neoacanthina fasciata Kertész, 1914

References

Stratiomyidae
Brachycera genera
Taxa named by Kálmán Kertész
Diptera of South America
Endemic fauna of Brazil